Osama Hassan (born October 24, 1979) is an Egyptian footballer with Ittihad. He moved to Zamalek from ENPPI along with Magdy Atwa. Osama is known for his brilliant free-kicks and his powerful left-footed shots. He is also a graduate of the El Ahly youth academy, despite being a Zamalek supporter.

Honors

with ENPPI
Egyptian Cup (2005)

with Zamalek
Egyptian Cup (2008)

External links

1979 births
Living people
Egyptian footballers
Egypt international footballers
ENPPI SC players
Zamalek SC players
Al Ittihad Alexandria Club players
Egyptian Premier League players
Association football wingers